DPU may refer to:

Universities 
 Dalian Polytechnic University, in Liaoning, China
 Danube Private University, in Krems an der Donau, Austria
 DePaul University, in Chicago, Illinois
 DePauw University, in Greencastle, Indiana
 Dhurakij Pundit University, in Bangkok, Thailand
 Dumlupınar University, in Turkey

Other uses
 Data processing unit
 Delayed pressure urticaria
 Depleted uranium
 Dinosaur Pile-Up, an English alternative rock band
 1,3-Diphenylurea, a type of plant hormone
 Distributed Power Unit, in rail transport
 Massachusetts Department of Public Utilities
 Delivered at Place Unloaded, an international trade term